Harrington (or Harington) is an English habitational name from places in Cumbria, Lincolnshire, and Northamptonshire. It is also a common surname in southwest Ireland, where it was adopted as an Anglicized form of the Gaelic surnames Ó hArrachtáin and Ó hIongardail. Notable people with the surname include:

Harrington 
Adam Harrington (disambiguation)
Al Harrington, American basketball player
Al Harrington (1935–2021), Samoan-American actor
Alan Harrington, Welsh footballer
Anna Short Harrington, actress portraying Aunt Jemima
Anthony David Harrington aka Anthony David, American R&B singer
Baron Harrington of Aldingham
Bernard Joseph Harrington, American clergyman
Beth Harrington, American filmmaker and musician
Betty Jean Harrington, American gymnast
Brette Harrington, American professional rock climber and alpinist
Brooke Harrington, American economic sociologist
Celestine Tate Harrington, street musician
Cheryl Francis Harrington, actress
Chris Harrington may refer to:
Chris Harrington (American football), American football player
Chris Harrington (ice hockey), ice hockey player
Conrad Harrington, Canadian businessman
Curtis Harrington, American film director
Dan Harrington may refer to :
Dan Harrington, poker player
Dan Harrington (Montana politician)
Daniel J. Harrington (1940–2014), American biblical scholar
David C. Harrington, American politician
The de Harringtons, English Barons of Muchland
Dedrick Harrington, American football player
Desmond Harrington, American actor
Donald J. Harrington, president of St. John's University in New York
Donald S. Harrington, American politician and religious leader
Doris Harrington, American baseball player
Doug Harrington, guitarist
Earl of Harrington
Ed Harrington, Canadian football player
Edith Marguerite Harrington, grandmother of the Duchess of Cornwall
Edward Harrington (disambiguation)
Edward Harrington, aka Eddy Clearwater, American blues musician
Emerson Harrington, American politician
Emily Harrington, American professional rock climber and adventurer
Eric Harrington, Canadian businessman
Ethel Harrington, American sprinter
Fred Harvey Harrington, American educator
George Harrington may refer to:
George Christy, American minstrel performer born George Harrington
George P. Harrington, American politician from Wisconsin
Gerry Harrington, Irish Gaelic athletics chairman
Gordon Sidney Harrington, Canadian politician
Hago Harrington, American ice-hockey player
Henry F. Harrington, American newspaper editor
Henry Moore Harrington, American military officer
Henry W. Harrington, American politician
Illtyd Harrington (1931–2015), British politician
Jack Harrington (Australian footballer)
Jack Harrington (English footballer)
James Harrington may refer to :
James Harrington (Yorkist knight)
James Harrington (author) (1611–1677), usually spelled Harington, English political philosopher
Major-General Sir James Harrington, 3rd Baronet, officer in the New Model Army
Jay Harrington, American actor
Jessica Harrington, Irish racehorse trainer
Jeremy Harrington, American YouTuber and voice actor 
J. J. Harrington, American politician
Joe Harrington (baseball)
Joey Harrington, American football player
John Harrington may refer to:
John Peabody Harrington (1884–1961), American linguist and ethnologist
 John Harrington (American football) (1921–1992), American football player
 John Harrington (baseball) (born c. late 1930s), American business manager
 John Harrington (ice hockey) (born 1957), American ice hockey player
Joseph Harrington may refer to:
Joseph Julian Harrington, North Carolina politician
Josh Harrington, American BMX rider
Kate Harrington, American actress
Kate Harrington (poet)
Kellie Harrington, Irish boxer
Kevin Harrington (actor), Australian actor
Laura Harrington, American actress
Laurence Harrington, British actor
Leo Harrington, American mathematician
Lorinza Harrington, American basketball player
Mae Harrington, American centenarian
Margaret Harrington, Canadian politician
Mark Harrington (disambiguation)
Martin Harrington, British songwriter and record producer
Maura Harrington, Irish activist
Michael Harrington may refer to:
Michael Harrington, American socialist
Michael J. Harrington, American politician
Michael Harrington (soccer)
Michael Harrington (Canadian writer), Canadian writer and editor
Mike Harrington, computer game developer
Nancy Harrington (1926–2020), American politician
Ollie Harrington, American cartoonist
Othella Harrington, American basketball player
Paddy Harrington (1933–2005), Irish sportsman, father of Pádraig
Pádraig Harrington, Irish golfer
Pat Harrington may refer to:
Pat Harrington, Sr., Canadian actor
Pat Harrington, Jr., his son, American actor
Pat Harrington (soccer), Canadian soccer player
 Patrick Harrington (disambiguation):
Patrick Harrington (activist), British far right politician
Patrick Harrington (Roman Catholic Bishop), Kenyan bishop
Paul Harrington (musician), Irish musician
Paul Randall Harrington, American orthopaedic surgeon and designer of the Harrington Rod
Perry Harrington, American football player
Perry G. Harrington, American politician
Phil Harrington, Welsh footballer
Rex Harrington, Canadian ballet dancer
Richard Harrington (photographer) (1911–2005), German-Canadian photographer
Richard Harrington (actor) (born 1975), Welsh actor
Richard Harrington (politician) (born 1957), former UK MP, now Minister of State for Refugees
Richard C. Harrington, British physician and psychologist
Robert Harrington may refer to:
Robert George Harrington (1904–1987), astronomer, worked at Palomar Observatory
Robert Sutton Harrington (1942–1993), astronomer, worked at the US Naval Observatory
Rod Harrington, English darts player
Roger F. Harrington, American electrical engineer and academic
Rowdy L. Harrington, American film director
Samuel M. Harrington (1882–1948), American marine officer
Samuel M. Harrington (politician), see List of justices of the Delaware Supreme Court
 Sara Leland (1941–2020), American ballet dancer and répétiteur born Sally Harrington
Scott Harrington may refer to:
Scott Harrington (racing driver) (born 1963), American racing driver
Scott Harrington (ice hockey) (born 1993), Canadian ice hockey player
S. W. Harrington, American physician, football player and coach
Steven Harrington aka Steve Strange, Welsh pop singer
Sybil B. Harrington (1908–1998), American philanthropist
Theophilus Harrington, American jurist
Thomas Harrington (disambiguation), including Tom
Tim Harrington, founding member of hard rock group Masters of Reality
Timothy Charles Harrington, Irish politician
Ty Harrington, American college baseball coach
Vincent F. Harrington, American politician
Wilfred Harrington, Irish priest
William Harrington (disambiguation), including Bill

Harington 
 Audrey Harington, aka Ethelreda, alleged illegitimate daughter of Henry VIII of England and the royal laundress
 Bridget Harington (1579–1609), British courtier
 Charles Harington (disambiguation) may refer to :
 Sir Charles Harington (chemist), Welsh chemist
 General Sir Charles Harington (British Army officer, born 1872), British army officer
 General Sir Charles Harington (British Army officer, born 1910), British army officer
 Donald Harington (writer), American novelist
 Edward Harington of Ridlington (died 1652), English landowner
 Hastings Edward Harington, English VC recipient
 Henry Harington (d. 1613), English soldier
 Herbert Harington, English soldier and cricketer
 James Harington (1611–1677), English author
 James Harington (lawyer) (died 1592) English landowner
 James Harington (1542–1614) of Ridlington, English landowner
 Sir James Harington, 3rd Baronet of Ridlington (1607–1680), English landowner
 John Harington, 2nd Baron Harington of Exton (1592–1614), English courtier
 John Harington, 1st Baron Harington of Exton (1539–1613), British politician
 John Harington (treasurer), official of Henry VIII
 John Harington (writer) (1561–1612), British writer, son of the treasurer and inventor of the flushable toilet
 Kit Harington (born 1986), English actor
 Lucy Harington, English Countess
 Mabel Harington (died 1603), English courtier
 Margaret Harington (died 1601), English courtier
 Odile Harington, alleged South African agent
 Sarah Harington (1565–1629), English courtier
 Theodosia Harington (died 1649), English courtier

English-language surnames
English toponymic surnames